Stuecken Branch is a stream in Warren County in the U.S. state of Missouri.

Stuecken Branch most likely has the name of one Mr. Stuecken, the original owner of the site.

See also
List of rivers of Missouri

References

Rivers of Warren County, Missouri
Rivers of Missouri